Penrhiwceiber railway station serves the village of Penrhiwceiber, Rhondda Cynon Taf, Wales. It is located on the Aberdare branch of the Merthyr Line between the town of Mountain Ash and the village of Abercynon. Passenger services are provided by Transport for Wales.

History
A station at this location was first opened by the Taff Vale Railway on 1 June 1883, and was originally named Penrhiwceiber; it was renamed Penrhiwceiber Low Level by the Great Western Railway on 1 July 1924. It was closed by the Western Region of British Railways on 16 March 1964 and a new station, named Penrhiwceiber, provided for reopening of the branch to passengers on 3 October 1988.

Services
In the evenings the service drops to hourly.

On Sundays there is a general 2-hourly service to Barry Island with an hourly service in the morning and in the late afternoon. This is due to a campaign by the local Assembly Member and a successful trial in December 2017. The extra services began in April 2018.

References

External links 

Railway stations in Rhondda Cynon Taf
DfT Category F2 stations
Former Taff Vale Railway stations
Railway stations in Great Britain opened in 1883
Railway stations in Great Britain closed in 1964
Railway stations in Great Britain opened in 1988
Railway stations served by Transport for Wales Rail
Beeching closures in Wales
1883 establishments in Wales
Reopened railway stations in Great Britain